Chihiro Kato may refer to:
 Chihiro Kato (volleyball) (born 1988), Japanese volleyball player
 Chihiro Kato (footballer) (born 1998), Japanese footballer